Eschata percandida is a moth in the family Crambidae. It was described by Charles Swinhoe in 1890. It is found in India.

References

Chiloini
Moths described in 1890